The Black Wall Street may refer to:

 Greenwood District, Tulsa, Oklahoma, a neighborhood containing many African-American businesses in the early 20th Century
 Tulsa race massacre of 1921, in which a white mob destroyed much of Greenwood
 Jackson Ward, a thriving African-American business community in Richmond, Virginia
 Black Wall Street (Durham, North Carolina), Parrish Street, in Durham, North Carolina, an area of successful black-owned businesses
 The Black Wall Street Records, a record label

See also

 
 Wall Street (disambiguation)